Viorica Țigău (born 12 August 1979) is a Romanian heptathlete.

She won the bronze medal at the 1998 World Junior Championships and finished 18th at the 2000 Olympic Games.

Her personal best result is 6289 points, achieved in June 2000 in Bucharest.

She also competes at a high level in the long jump, appearing in that event at three Olympics (2000, 2008 and 2012). Her personal best jump is 6.85 metres, achieved in August 2000 in Bucharest.

References

External links

1979 births
Living people
Romanian heptathletes
Romanian female long jumpers
Athletes (track and field) at the 2000 Summer Olympics
Athletes (track and field) at the 2008 Summer Olympics
Athletes (track and field) at the 2012 Summer Olympics
Olympic athletes of Romania